Twig is an unincorporated community in Grand Lake Township, Saint Louis County, Minnesota, United States.

The community is located 15 miles northwest of the city of Duluth at the junction of U.S. Highway 53 and Saint Louis County Road 7 (Industrial Road).

Twig is located within the Saginaw, MN area ZIP code 55779.

Twig is mentioned in a newspaper in the film Fantastic Beasts and Where to Find Them.

Notable people
 Garry Bjorklund, long-distance runner
 Dylan Samberg NHL Player

References

 Rand McNally Road Atlas – 2007 edition – Minnesota entry
 Official State of Minnesota Highway Map – 2011/2012 edition

Unincorporated communities in Minnesota
Unincorporated communities in St. Louis County, Minnesota